Wouter Van Belle is a Belgian musician and producer. He is known for his work with Flip Kowlier, Gorki, Noordkaap, Arno, Axelle Red, Yevgueni, Novastar and Racoon. He scored as producer four number-one albums in Flanders and one in the Netherlands, and had top three singles in Flanders, France and the Netherlands. He is also the keyboard player for Dead Man Ray.

One of his first productions was Gorky, the debut album of Belgian band Gorki. Van Belle was responsible for much of the sound and melody of the song Mia, which he turned from a punkrock song into a piano ballad. Despite never being released as a single, it became a classic which was voted the best song ever by the listeners of Studio Brussel and best Belgian song ever by the listeners of Radio 1. Van Belle not only produced the album, but also created the piano melody for the song. The number 2 song in the above mentioned list of best Belgian songs ever, Als ze lacht by Yevgueni, was also produced by Van Belle. In the 2005 version of that all-time Flemish songs list, he was involved as producer, mixer, writer and/or musician with 18 of the 100 songs.

In 1994 he won the Zamu Music Award for Best Producer. 

He created his own label "Petrol" in 2000, to release an album he produced for Flip Kowlier which was then rejected by his original label. Ocharme ik reached #18 in the Flemish charts, and Van Belle would continue to release music on his own label, not only by Kowlier but also by Yevgueni and Gabriel Rios. In 2006 he released a solo album, Wow/Flutter.

In 2011 he was one of the four judges on Idool, the Flemish version of British TV show Pop Idol.

In 2020, he was inducted into the "Eregalerij" (Hall of Fame) of Radio 2, the largest radio station in Flanders, for his "large influence on Belgian music" The Hall of Fame lauded his work as a producer and as talent developer with e.g. Axelle Red and Flip Kowlier.

Charted singles

As writer or composer
Arno, Vive ma liberté (1993), reached #48 in the Flemish charts
Margriet Hermans, Alle mooie mannen zijn zo lelijk... (als ik je zie) (1990), #53 on the Dutch charts

As producer
Axelle Red
A quoi ça sert (1996), reached #45 in the French charts
À tâtons (1996), reached #30 in Wallonia and #35 in Flanders
Elle danse seule (1992), #11 in Flanders
Je t'attends, #113 in France and #22 in Flanders
Le monde tourne mal (1993), #28 in Flanders and #38 in France
Rester femme (1996), #9 in France
Sensualité (1996), #2 in France (remained in the charts for 46 weeks) and #6 in Belgium
Belgian Asociality
De gefrustreerde automobilist (1995), #50 in Flanders
Morregen (1994), #47 in Flanders
Flip Kowlier
Directeur (2013), #41 in Flanders
Mo ba nin (2010), #30 in Flanders
Gorki/Gorky (band changed name)
Anja (1990), #36 in Flanders
Lieve kleine Piranha (1991), #50 in Flanders
Soms vraagt een mens zich af (1992), #32 in Flanders
Kid Safari, Blue (1994), #38 in Flanders
MC Baker & The PCB, Don't Mess It Up (1991), #29 in Flanders
Noordkaap
Ik hou van u (1995), #22 in Flanders
Satelliet Suzy (1996), #21 in Flanders
Novastar
Lost & Blown Away (2000), #45 in Flanders and #92 in the Netherlands
Wrong (1999), #43 in Flanders and #47 in the Netherlands
Paul Michiels, One Day At A Time (1998), #44 in FLanders
Racoon
Brick By Brick (2014), #32 in the Netherlands
Don't Give Up The Fight (2011), #8 in the Netherlands
Freedom (2011), #81 in the Netherlands
Liverpool Rain (2011), #56 in the Netherlands
No Mercy (2011), #3 in the Netherlands
Oceaan (2012), #6 in the Netherlands (64 weeks in the charts)
Shoes Of Lightning (2013), #5 in the Netherlands
Took A Hit (2011), #57 in the Netherlands
Stash, Sadness (2004), #2 in Belgium (33 weeks in the charts), #96 in the Netherlands
Volt, They're Gonna Sample Me (1993), #50 in Flanders
Wigbert, Ebbenhout blues (1991), #5 in Flanders

Charted albums (as producer)
Axelle Red
À Tâtons (1996), #3 in Flanders, #5 in France and #6 in Wallonia
Con solo pensarlo (1998), #1 in Flanders and #5 in Wallonia
Sans plus attendre (1993), #16 in Flanders, #19 in Wallonia, #46 in France
Belgian Asociality, Adenosine Trifosfaat Preparaat (1995), #44 in Flanders
BiezeBaaze, Wachten op misschien (2003), #31 in Flanders
Flip Kowlier
Ocharme ik (2001), #18 in Flanders
In de fik (2004), #2 in Flanders
Otoradio (2010), #7 in Flanders
Cirque - De avonturen van W.M. Warlop (2013), #7 in Flanders
Geike Arnaert, Lost In Time (2019), #3 in Flanders
Gorky, Gorky (1992), #39 in Flanders
Laïs, Douce victime (2004), #3 in Flanders
Noordkaap, Programma '96, #8 in Flanders
Novastar, Novastar, #1 in Flanders and #66 in the Netherlands
Paul Michiels, The Inner Child (1998), #10 in Flanders
Racoon
Liverpool Rain (2011), #1 in the Netherlands and #109 in Flanders
Stash
Blue Lanes (2007), #24 in Flanders
Rock 'n Roll Show (2005), #1 in Flanders
Yevgueni
Aan de arbeid (2007), #13 in Flanders
Kannibaal (2004), #50 in Flanders
We zijn hier nu toch (2009), #1 in Flanders

Notes

Living people
Belgian musicians
Belgian record producers
Year of birth missing (living people)